Pekka Juhani Huhtaniemi (born 9 November 1949, in Valkeakoski) is a Finnish diplomat. He served as Finland's ambassador to the United Kingdom in 2010-2015. In 2006-2010, Huhtaniemi was the Undersecretary of State for Trade in Foreign Affairs.

Early life and education
Huhtaniemi graduated as an undergraduate in 1968 and a Master of Political Science from the University of Helsinki in 1971.

Career
Huhtaniemi joined the Ministry for Foreign Affairs in 1972.

From 1995 to 1998, Huhtaniemi served as chief cabinet secretary to Erkki Liikanen, at the European Commission, in Brussels. He served as Ambassador at the Finnish Permanent Representation in Geneva, 1998-2003 and in Oslo, 2003-2005.

Other activities
 European Bank for Reconstruction and Development (EBRD), Ex-Officio Alternate Member of the Board of Governors (2006-2010)

Personal life
Huhtaniemi is married and has three children.

References 

Ambassadors of Finland to the United Kingdom
Permanent Representatives of Finland to the United Nations
1949 births
Living people